The Argentina women's national handball team is the national team of Argentina. It is governed by the Confederacion Argentina de Handball and takes part in international handball competitions.

Results

Olympic Games

World Championship

Pan American Games

Pan American Championship

South and Central American Championship

Performance in other tournaments 

2016 Women's International Tournament of Spain – 4th
2017 Women's International Tournament of Spain – 3rd
2019 Baltic Handball Cup – 4th
2019 Intersport Cup – 4th

Current squad
Squad for the 2021 World Women's Handball Championship.

Head coach: Eduardo Gallardo

References

External links

IHF profile

National team
Handball
Women's national handball teams